The canton of Vic-sur-Aisne is an administrative division in northern France. At the French canton reorganisation which came into effect in March 2015, the canton was expanded from 25 to 50 communes:
 
Ambleny
Audignicourt
Barisis-aux-Bois
Berny-Rivière
Besmé
Bichancourt
Bieuxy
Blérancourt
Bourguignon-sous-Coucy
Camelin
Champs
Cœuvres-et-Valsery
Coucy-le-Château-Auffrique
Coucy-la-Ville
Crécy-au-Mont
Cutry
Dommiers
Épagny
Folembray
Fontenoy
Fresnes-sous-Coucy
Guny
Jumencourt
Landricourt
Laversine
Leuilly-sous-Coucy
Manicamp
Montigny-Lengrain
Morsain
Mortefontaine
Nouvron-Vingré
Pernant
Pont-Saint-Mard
Quierzy
Quincy-Basse
Ressons-le-Long
Saconin-et-Breuil
Saint-Aubin
Saint-Bandry
Saint-Christophe-à-Berry
Saint-Paul-aux-Bois
Saint-Pierre-Aigle
Selens
Septvaux
Tartiers
Trosly-Loire
Vassens
Verneuil-sous-Coucy
Vézaponin
Vic-sur-Aisne

Demographics

See also
Cantons of the Aisne department 
Communes of France

References

Cantons of Aisne